Let Me In is an album by guitarist and singer Johnny Winter.    It was released in 1991 on vinyl and CD by Pointblank Records.

Let Me In was nominated for a Grammy Award for Best Contemporary Blues Album.

Critical reception

On AllMusic, Thom Owens said, "Though the set focuses on blues material, Winters [sic] can never leave his rock roots behind — the sheer volume and pile-driving energy of his performances ensures that."

In the Chicago Tribune, Dan Kening wrote, "The original "White Tornado" returns with a strong outing that both reinforces his reputation as a world-class blues guitarist and indicates a growing maturity....   Winter shows he has at long last learned to balance technical flash with emotional substance."

In the Chicago Reader, David Whiteis wrote, "Johnny Winter's Let Me In is a new contribution from a bluesman well on his way to elder-statesman status.... At this point Winter's guitar is beyond criticism — he's toned down his excesses, but he's still got that machine-gun multinote style, playing straight-ahead blues in manic linear patterns — he doesn't build a solo so much as blast straight through it."

Track listing
"Illustrated Man" (Fred James, Mary-Ann Brandon) – 3:37
"Barefootin'" (Robert Parker) – 4:06
"Life Is Hard" (Fred James) – 6:17
"Hey You" (Mike Himelstein) – 2:42
"Blue Mood" (Jessie Mae Robinson) – 3:01
"Sugaree" (Marty Robbins) – 2:57
"Medicine Man" (Robbie Fisher, Henley Douglas) – 4:22
"You're Humbuggin' Me" (Rocket Morgan, J.D. Miller) – 2:43
"If You Got a Good Woman" (Johnny Winter) – 4:23
"Got to Find My Baby" (John Heartsman) – 2:40
"Shame Shame Shame" (Jimmy Reed) – 4:16
"Let Me In" (Johnny Winter) – 4:11
"You Lie Too Much" (Mac Rebennack) – 4:03*

 "You Lie Too Much" was omitted from the vinyl issue.

Personnel
Musicians
Johnny Winter – electric guitar, acoustic guitar, vocals
Jeff Ganz – electric bass, fretless bass, upright bass
Tom Compton – drums
Dr. John – piano on "Barefootin'", "Life Is Hard", "Sugaree", "You Lie Too Much"
Ken Saydak – piano on "If You Got a Good Woman"
Billy Branch – harmonica on "Hey You", "If You Got a Good Woman", "Shame Shame Shame"
Dennis, Margaret, Johnny and Brian Drugan, Dave Brickson, John Gabrysiak, Dick Shurman – ensemble vocals on "Hey You"
Production
Dick Shurman, Johnny Winter – producers
David Axelbaum – engineer
Dave Brickson – assistant engineer
Greg Calbi – mastering
Mark Weiss – photography
Bill Smith – design
Recorded and mixed at Streeterville Recording Studios, Chicago

References

Johnny Winter albums
1991 albums
Albums produced by Johnny Winter